The 2014–15 College of Charleston Cougars women's basketball team represents the College of Charleston during the 2014–15 NCAA Division I women's basketball season. The Cougars play their home games at the TD Arena and will be in their second year as members of the Colonial Athletic Association.  The Cougars were led by first year head coach Candice M. Jackson. They finished the season 5–25, 3–15 in CAA play to finish in ninth place. They lost in the first round of the CAA women's tournament to Towson.

Roster

Schedule

|-
!colspan=9 style="background:#800000; color:#F0E68C;"| Exhibition

|-
!colspan=9 style="background:#800000; color:#F0E68C;"| Regular Season

|-
!colspan=9 style="background:#800000; color:#F0E68C;"| 2015 CAA Tournament

See also
2014–15 College of Charleston Cougars men's basketball team

References

College of Charleston Cougars women's basketball seasons
College Of Charleston